State Highway 185 (SH 185) is a Texas state highway that runs from Victoria southeast to the Gulf of Mexico at Port O'Connor.

History
The route was originally designated on January 20, 1932 from Seadrift northwest to a connection with then-SH 57 (now SH 35), but was erroneously omitted from the state highway log and therefore was unnumbered. On November 30, 1932, this highway was added to the state highway log and numbered SH 185. On September 26, 1939, the route was extended to Port O'Connor, replacing a portion of SH 29. On October 16, 1951, an extension of SH 185 to Victoria was signed, but not designated, along FM 404. On August 29, 1990, the extension to Victoria was officially designated, replacing FM 404.

Major intersections

References

185
Transportation in Victoria County, Texas
Transportation in Calhoun County, Texas